Mark Dennis Tate Renn (1952–2019) was a British sculptor who created several works of public art, mainly in the English Midlands.

Renn was born in 1952 and trained in Birmingham.

Although primarily known for his sculpture, his first commission, in 1978, was a series of three murals on the gable ends of terraced houses at the eastern end of Heathfield Road, Handsworth, Birmingham, in conjunction with Paula Woof and Steve Field. These murals lasted around 27 years before being overpainted by new murals. In 1982, he painted an internal mural at Frankley Community School, together with Woof and Field. The trio worked as "The Mural Company" and were profiled in a 1982 Central Television documentary, "Round About". In June–July 1984, Field and Renn exhibited on murals, jointly, at Bilston Museum and Art Gallery.

He also spent the early part of his career working on live art events and temporary installations. He was a member of the art groups "BAG" (1974–1977 with Paula Woof and Ian Everard), "Meet the Future" and "Fine Rats International" (1989–1993); he described the latter as "an edgy group of four egomaniac visual artists". His The Fall involved fully-glazed greenhouses being dropped from cranes, underneath Gravelly Hill Interchange ("Spaghetti Junction"), with the timing decided by games of bingo.

Renn, Woof, Field, David Patten and Derek Jones worked jointly as the West Midlands Public Art Collective, which was active circa 1987.

Several of sculptural his works play with parallax, appearing abstract until viewed from a specific angle. One such sculpture is The Darwin Gate in Shrewsbury, which from a certain angle appears to form a dome, according to Historic England, in "the form of a Saxon helmet with a Norman window... inspired by features of St Mary's Church which was attended by Charles Darwin as a boy". Other examples include Pegasus (1999) at Cork Airport, Ireland, Green Man Walking (2003) at Sanders Park, Bromsgrove, and The Selby Medal (2012) at Selby War Memorial Hospital, Yorkshire.

His other public works include Clink at Stourbridge Junction railway station, Shoal (2008), on the Castle Grange Business Park, Nottinghamshire, Blue Beacon (2009) at the South Wales Police headquarters in Bute Town, Cardiff, Clockwork, outside Jewellery Quarter station, Birmingham, Moontrap at Smethwick Galton Bridge interchange, and "Lost Property Sun" (2010) at Birmingham Snow Hill station.

He collaborated with Mick Thacker on several sculptures, as well as the "Charm Bracelet Pavement Trail", a series of sixteen pavement plaques depicting the local history of the Jewellery Quarter in Birmingham. The duo also oversaw artworks added during the 1997 restoration of Jubilee House, High Street, Madeley, as well as contributing a weather vane and a sculpture.

Plans for a Renn-Thacker collaborative sculpture at the junction of the A41 road and the M53 motorway in The Wirral had to be abandoned after the Highways Agency determined that it could cause distraction to drivers and attract pedestrians onto the roadway. The design had earlier caused controversy due to an inadvertent similarity to To The Skellig, a sculpture in Cahersiveen, County Kerry, Ireland.

Renn worked from a studio in Lee Bank, Birmingham and after that was closed following local government funding cuts, from a studio at his home in Cookley, Worcestershire.

As a side-line, he operated a business, "Big Pan Man", renting out commercial catering equipment.

He died in late 2019, and was survived by his wife, Anna.

Works 

|}

References

External links 

 Mark Renn & Associates

1952 births
2019 deaths
Artists from Worcestershire
English sculptors
English male sculptors
English muralists
20th-century British sculptors
21st-century British sculptors
21st-century male artists
People from Wyre Forest District